King Martha is the second album by the band Ist, released in 2005.

Track listing
All songs Hall/Haynes/McCourt except * Hall/Haynes/McCourt/Ilett

"Momentary Glitch" – 4:33
"Apologia" – 2:37
"Duty Calls" – 3:14
"Haunted" – 4:05
"Evelyn Harper" – 3:52
"Unsteady On My Feet" – 3:50
"Audrey Hepburn"*  – 3:56
"Shall We Begin...?" – 2:23
"An Invasion of Crows" – 3:25
"The Silence"* – 2:22
"Death and the Songwriter"* – 3:46
"Here We Go Again" – 2:15
"Selfish Terrors" – 13:28

Personnel
Kenton Hall - guitar, keyboards, vocals
John McCourt - bass, vocals
Flash - percussion, drums, vocals
Paul Swannell - piano, keyboards
Brett Richardson - bassoon, conductor, string arrangements
Jack Bomb - guitar, vocals
Gaz Birtles - alto sax
John Barrow - tenor sax
Kevin Hewick - vocals
Anna Jordan - piano, keyboards
Jon Read - trumpet
Drew Stansall - sax
Jim Lindsay - trombone
Na'im Cortazzi - vocals
Liam Dullaghan - guitar, vocals
Sophia Marshall - vocals
Sarah Louise Collins - clarinet
Jody Moore - french horn
Strung Out Sisters - string trio
Howard Smith - lap steel
Filthmongers' Choir - vocals

References

2005 albums